Hof is an electoral constituency (German: Wahlkreis) represented in the Bundestag. It elects one member via first-past-the-post voting. Under the current constituency numbering system, it is designated as constituency 239. It is located in northeastern Bavaria, comprising the city of Hof and the districts of Landkreis Hof and Wunsiedel.

Hof was created for the inaugural 1949 federal election. Since 2002, it has been represented by Hans-Peter Friedrich of the Christian Social Union (CSU).

Geography
Hof is located in northeastern Bavaria. As of the 2021 federal election, it comprises the independent city of Hof, the Wunsiedel district, and the entirety of the Hof district excluding the municipality of Geroldsgrün.

History
Hof was created in 1949. In the 1949 election, it was Bavaria constituency 28 in the numbering system. In the 1953 through 1961 elections, it was number 223. In the 1965 through 1998 elections, it was number 225. In the 2002 and 2005 elections, it was number 240. Since the 2009 election, it has been number 239.

Originally, the constituency comprised the independent cities of Hof and Selb and the districts of Landkreis Hof, Münchberg, and Rehau. In the 1965 through 1972 elections, it also contained the Naila district. In the 1976 through 2013 elections, it comprised the city of Hof and the districts of Landkreis Hof and Wunsiedel. It lost the municipality of Geroldsgrün in the 2017 election.

Members
The constituency was first represented by Arno Behrisch of the Social Democratic Party (SPD) from 1949 to 1953. Heinz Starke won it in 1953; he was elected for the Free Democratic Party (FDP) with the endorsement of the Christian Social Union (CSU). Gerhard Wacher of the CSU was elected in 1957 and served until 1961. Martin Hirsch of the SPD won the constituency in 1961 and served three terms. He was succeeded by Hans Büchler from 1972 to 1983. Jürgen Warnke of the CSU then served from 1983 to 1998, when Petra Ernstberger of the SPD was elected. Hans-Peter Friedrich of the CSU was elected in 2002, and re-elected in 2005, 2009, 2013, 2017, and 2021.

Election results

2021 election

2017 election

2013 election

2009 election

References

Federal electoral districts in Bavaria
1949 establishments in West Germany
Constituencies established in 1949
Hof, Bavaria
Hof (district)
Wunsiedel (district)